Natalia Dianskaya (born 7 March 1989) is a Russian volleyball player.

Career 
In volleyball, Dianskaya played for the Women's National Team at the 2013 FIVB Women's World Grand Champions Cup.

She played for Dinamo Krasnodar.

References

External links 

 
 

Living people
1989 births
Russian women's volleyball players
Universiade gold medalists for Russia
Universiade medalists in volleyball
Medalists at the 2013 Summer Universiade
20th-century Russian women
21st-century Russian women